Paragon Systems Inc. is a United States-based private security and investigation firm, and is headquartered in Herndon, VA. Paragon Systems is a subsidiary of Securitas. As of January 1, 2008 Paragon Systems had received contracts totaling $363 million.

Overview
In April 2008, Paragon Systems was awarded a $56 million contract from the United States Department of Homeland Security.  Paragon took over the contract from USProtect and provided security services for federal government facilities. 

In December 2006, Paragon Systems reportedly lost accountability of four Glock 23 pistols from their armory at the DHS headquarters facility. Federal Security Officers Go on Strike in Dallas.

References

USAspending.gov
Ways to Improve Commercial Building Security
Paragon Systems Wins Security Guard Contract Prote
Paragon Systems Sued By Maryland Security Company Over Accre

External links

ADT Home Security

Private detectives and investigators
Security companies of the United States
Companies traded over-the-counter in the United States